Tõnis Palts (born 29 March 1953, in Kuressaare) is an Estonian politician and former mayor of Tallinn and Minister of Finance.

References 

This article incorporates information from the equivalent article on the Estonian Wikipedia.

1953 births
Living people
Finance ministers of Estonia
People from Kuressaare
Mayors of Tallinn
21st-century Estonian politicians
Members of the Riigikogu, 2003–2007
Members of the Riigikogu, 2011–2015